Radomiro Tomic Romero (7 May 1914 – 3 January 1992) was a Chilean politician of Croatian origin. He was one of the most prominent leaders of that country's Christian Democratic Party.

Born in Calama, Tomic received his law degree from the Universidad Católica de Chile (UC), where he first became involved in political activity, in the Social Christian Party. One of the co-founders in 1938 of the Falange Nacional (later the Christian Democrat Party of Chile or PDC), he became president of the party 1946–1947 and 1952–1953. He was married to Olaya Errázuriz Echenique, and together they had 9 children.

Among other activities Tomic was director of the newspaper El Tarapacá of Iquique (1937–1941) and later of the Editorial del Pacífico.

Tomic served as deputy for Arica, Pisagua and Iquique (1941–1949). When senator and poet Pablo Neruda was banned by the Ley de Defensa Permanente de la Democracia (Law for the Permanent Defense of Democracy)—which banned the Communist Party of Chile and removed numerous voters from the rolls)—Tomić won the vacated seat in a by-election. He served as senator for Tarapacá and Antofagasta (1950–1953), and then for Aconcagua and Valparaíso (1961–1965). In 1965 he resigned his senatorial seat to become Chile's ambassador to the United States (4 March 1965 – April 1968).

As leader of the progressive wing of the Christian Democrats, he was the party's presidential candidate in the 1970 election in which Salvador Allende won a plurality and, with Tomic's support, was ratified by parliament as president. Allende died three years later in the Chilean coup of 1973, which put an end to democracy in Chile for over 15 years.

As a parliamentarian and politician Tomic was a defender of Chilean sovereignty over the country's copper deposits and in the nationalization of that industry. In 1997, CODELCO named a mine  in his honor.

Tomic died in 1992 in Santiago.

References
 This article draws heavily on the corresponding article in the Spanish Wikipedia.

1914 births
1992 deaths
People from El Loa Province
Chilean people of Croatian descent
National Falange politicians
Christian Democratic Party (Chile) politicians
Deputies of the XXXIX Legislative Period of the National Congress of Chile
Deputies of the XL Legislative Period of the National Congress of Chile
Members of the Senate of Chile
Candidates for President of Chile
Ambassadors of Chile to the United States
Pontifical Catholic University of Chile alumni